The year 2005 is the 17th year in the history of Shooto, a mixed martial arts promotion based in Japan. In 2005 Shooto held 27 events beginning with, Shooto: 1/29 in Korakuen Hall.

Title fights

Events list

Shooto: 1/29 in Korakuen Hall

Shooto: 1/29 in Korakuen Hall was an event held on January 29, 2005 at Korakuen Hall in Tokyo, Japan.

Results

Shooto: 2/6 in Kitazawa Town Hall

Shooto: 2/6 in Kitazawa Town Hall was an event held on February 6, 2005 at Korakuen Hall in Tokyo, Japan.

Results

G-Shooto: Plus01

G-Shooto: Plus01 was an event held on February 11, 2005 at Korakuen Hall in Tokyo, Japan.

Results

Shooto: 3/11 in Korakuen Hall

Shooto: 3/11 in Korakuen Hall was an event held on March 11, 2005 at Korakuen Hall in Tokyo, Japan.

Results

G-Shooto: G-Shooto 02

G-Shooto: G-Shooto 02 was an event held on March 12, 2005 at Korakuen Hall in Tokyo, Japan.

Results

Shooto: Gig Central 7

Shooto: Gig Central 7 was an event held on March 27, 2005 at Korakuen Hall in Tokyo, Japan.

Results

Shooto: 4/23 in Hakata Star Lanes

Shooto: 4/23 in Hakata Star Lanes was an event held on April 23, 2005 at Korakuen Hall in Tokyo, Japan.

Results

Shooto: 5/4 in Korakuen Hall

Shooto: 5/4 in Korakuen Hall was an event held on May 4, 2005 at Korakuen Hall in Tokyo, Japan.

Results

Shooto: 5/8 in Osaka Prefectural Gymnasium

Shooto: 5/8 in Osaka Prefectural Gymnasium was an event held on May 8, 2005 at Korakuen Hall in Tokyo, Japan.

Results

G-Shooto: Special 01

G-Shooto: Special 01 was an event held on May 11, 2005 at Korakuen Hall in Tokyo, Japan.

Results

Shooto: Grapplingman 4

Shooto: Grapplingman 4 was an event held on May 22, 2005 at Korakuen Hall in Tokyo, Japan.

Results

Shooto: 5/29 in Kitazawa Town Hall

Shooto: 5/29 in Kitazawa Town Hall was an event held on May 29, 2005 at Korakuen Hall in Tokyo, Japan.

Results

Shooto: 6/3 in Kitazawa Town Hall

Shooto: 6/3 in Kitazawa Town Hall was an event held on June 3, 2005 at Korakuen Hall in Tokyo, Japan.

Results

Shooto: Gig Central 8

Shooto: Gig Central 8 was an event held on July 3, 2005 at Korakuen Hall in Tokyo, Japan.

Results

G-Shooto: Plus02

G-Shooto: Plus02 was an event held on July 12, 2005 at Korakuen Hall in Tokyo, Japan.

Results

Shooto: Shooter's Summer

Shooto: Shooter's Summer was an event held on July 14, 2005 at Korakuen Hall in Tokyo, Japan.

Results

Shooto 2005: 7/30 in Korakuen Hall

Shooto 2005: 7/30 in Korakuen Hall was an event held on July 30, 2005 at Korakuen Hall in Tokyo, Japan.

Results

Shooto: Alive Road

Shooto: Alive Road was an event held on August 20, 2005 at Korakuen Hall in Tokyo, Japan.

Results

G-Shooto: Plus03

G-Shooto: Plus03 was an event held on September 16, 2005 at Korakuen Hall in Tokyo, Japan.

Results

Shooto: 9/23 in Korakuen Hall

Shooto: 9/23 in Korakuen Hall was an event held on September 23, 2005 at Korakuen Hall in Tokyo, Japan.

Results

Shooto: Soulful Fight

Shooto: Soulful Fight was an event held on October 28, 2005 at Korakuen Hall in Tokyo, Japan.

Results

Shooto 2005: 11/6 in Korakuen Hall

Shooto 2005: 11/6 in Korakuen Hall was an event held on November 6, 2005 at Korakuen Hall in Tokyo, Japan.

Results

G-Shooto: Plus04

G-Shooto: Plus04 was an event held on November 11, 2005 at Korakuen Hall in Tokyo, Japan.

Results

Shooto: Shooto & Kakumei Kickboxing

Shooto: Shooto & Kakumei Kickboxing was an event held on November 13, 2005 at Korakuen Hall in Tokyo, Japan.

Results

Shooto 2005: 11/29 in Kitazawa Town Hall

Shooto 2005: 11/29 in Kitazawa Town Hall was an event held on November 29, 2005 at Korakuen Hall in Tokyo, Japan.

Results

Shooto: 12/17 in Shinjuku Face

Shooto: 12/17 in Shinjuku Face was an event held on December 17, 2005 at Korakuen Hall in Tokyo, Japan.

Results

G-Shooto: G-Shooto 03

G-Shooto: G-Shooto 03 was an event held on December 17, 2005 at Korakuen Hall in Tokyo, Japan.

Results

See also 
 Shooto
 List of Shooto champions
 List of Shooto Events

References

Shooto events
2005 in mixed martial arts